The United States Office of Management and Budget (OMB) has defined 927 core-based statistical areas (CBSAs) for the United States and 12 for Puerto Rico. The OMB defines a core-based statistical area as one or more adjacent counties or county equivalents that have at least one urban core area of at least 10,000 population, plus adjacent territory that has a high degree of social and economic integration with the core as measured by commuting ties. The 939 core-based statistical areas currently defined by the OMB include the 392 metropolitan statistical areas (MSAs), which have an urban core population of at least 50,000, and the 547 micropolitan statistical areas (μSAs), which have an urban core population of at least 10,000 but less than 50,000.


United States

The following sortable table lists the 927 core-based statistical areas (CBSAs) of the United States with the following information:
 The CBSA rank by population as of July 1, 2020, as estimated by the United States Census Bureau
 The CBSA name as designated by the United States Office of Management and Budget
 The CBSA population as of July 1, 2020, as estimated by the United States Census Bureau
 The CBSA population as of April 1, 2010, as enumerated by the 2010 United States census
 The percent CBSA population change from April 1, 2010, to July 1, 2020
 The combined statistical area (CSA) if the CBSA is a component

See the distribution of statistical areas for the number of core-based statistical areas by state.

Puerto Rico
The following sortable table lists the 12 core-based statistical areas (CBSAs) of Puerto Rico with the following information:
 The CBSA rank by population as of July 1, 2020, as estimated by the United States Census Bureau
 The CBSA name as designated by the United States Office of Management and Budget
 The CBSA population as of July 1, 2020, as estimated by the United States Census Bureau
 The CBSA population as of April 1, 2010, as enumerated by the 2010 United States census
 The CBSA percent population change from April 1, 2010, to July 1, 2020
 The combined statistical area (CSA) if the CBSA is a component

See also

 United States of America
 Outline of the United States
 Index of United States-related articles
 
 Demographics of the United States
 United States Census Bureau
 List of U.S. states and territories by population
 List of metropolitan areas of the United States
 List of United States cities by population
 List of United States counties and county-equivalents

United States Office of Management and Budget
Statistical area (United States)
Combined statistical area (list)
Core-based statistical area (list)
Metropolitan statistical area (list)
Micropolitan statistical area (list)

References

External links

 United States Government
 Feb 2013 CBSA Delineation Files
 United States Census Bureau
 2010 United States Census
 USCB population estimates
 United States Office of Management and Budget

 
United States demography-related lists